Government Polytechnic Nainital (previously known as Nainital Polytechnic Nainital) is a technical education institute located at Nainital, Uttarakhand. Established in 1975, the institute is affiliated from Uttarakhand Technical Education Board, Roorkee and All India Council For Technical Education, New Delhi.

Courses offered by institute are Civil Engineering, Computer Application, Electrical Engineering, Electronics Engineering, Information Tech., Mechanical Engineering, Modern Office Mgt. & Sec. Prac., and Pharmacy. Before Uttarakhand Technical Education Board, Roorkee affiliation Institute was affiliated from UP Technical Board, Lucknow.

Govt. Polytechnic, Nainital was in those few Polytechnics established at Uttarakhand.

References

Principles 
1.Present Mr. P.R.Patel

External links 
 Nainital
 Government Polytechnic Nainital at wikimapia

Universities and colleges in Uttarakhand
Engineering colleges in Uttarakhand
Education in Nainital
Educational institutions established in 1975
1975 establishments in Uttar Pradesh